Sağolcan (also, Sağlocan, Saqolcan, Sagoldzhan, Sakhladzhan, and Sokhuldzhan) is a village in the Siazan Rayon of Azerbaijan.  The village forms part of the municipality of Sədan.

References 

Kaspi Newspaper

Populated places in Siyazan District